Kramgoa låtar 15 is a 1987 Vikingarna studio album. In 2003, the album was rerelased in the box set 100% guldfavoriter.

Track listing
Aldrig aldrig mer
Kärleksrosen
Tänk när det blir sommar
Hallå Mary Lou hello Mary Lou
Roses Are Red
Vem
Love's Been Good To Me
En gång skall vi åter mötas
Du är ung du är fri
Det finns en glädje i musiken
Ljuvliga sommar
Den första kärleken
Golden Gate
Håll varandra hårt

Charts

Certification

References 

1987 albums
Vikingarna (band) albums
Swedish-language albums